In anatomy, the mandible, lower jaw or jawbone is the largest, strongest and lowest bone in the human facial skeleton. It forms the lower jaw and holds the lower teeth in place. The mandible sits beneath the maxilla. It is the only movable bone of the skull (discounting the ossicles of the middle ear). It is connected to the temporal bones by the temporomandibular joints.

The bone is formed in the fetus from a fusion of the left and right mandibular prominences, and the point where these sides join, the mandibular symphysis, is still visible as a faint ridge in the midline. Like other symphyses in the body, this is a midline articulation where the bones are joined by fibrocartilage, but this articulation fuses together in early childhood.

The word "mandible" derives from the Latin word mandibula, "jawbone" (literally "one used for chewing"), from mandere "to chew" and -bula (instrumental suffix).

Structure

Components 

The mandible consists of:
 The body, found at the front
 A ramus on the left and the right, the rami rise up from the body of the mandible and meet with the body at the angle of the mandible or the gonial angle.

Body 

The body of the mandible is curved, and the front part gives structure to the chin. It has two surfaces and two borders. From the outside, the mandible is marked in the midline by a faint ridge, indicating the mandibular symphysis, the line of junction of the two halves of the mandible, which fuse at about one year of age. This ridge divides below and encloses a triangular eminence, the mental protuberance (the chin), the base of which is depressed in the center but raised on both sides to form the mental tubercle. Just above this, on both sides, the mentalis muscles attach to a depression called the incisive fossa. Below the second premolar tooth, on both sides, midway between the upper and lower borders of the body, are the mental foramen, for the passage of the mental vessels and nerve. Running backward and upward from each mental tubercle is a faint ridge, the oblique line, which is continuous with the anterior border of the ramus. Attached to this is the masseter muscle, the depressor labii inferioris and depressor anguli oris, and the platysma (from below).

From the inside, the mandible appears concave. Near the lower part of the symphysis is a pair of laterally placed spines, termed the mental spines, which give origin to the genioglossus. Immediately below these is a second pair of spines, or more frequently a median ridge or impression, for the origin of the geniohyoid. In some cases, the mental spines are fused to form a single eminence, in others they are absent and their position is indicated merely by an irregularity of the surface. Above the mental spines, a median foramen and furrow are sometimes seen; they mark the line of union of the halves of the bone. Below the mental spines, on either side of the middle line, is an oval depression for the attachment of the anterior belly of the digastric. Extending upward and backward on either side from the lower part of the symphysis is the mylohyoid line, which gives origin to the mylohyoid muscle; the posterior part of this line, near the alveolar margin, gives attachment to a small part of the constrictor pharyngis superior, and to the pterygomandibular raphe. Above the anterior part of this line is a smooth triangular area against which the sublingual gland rests, and below the hinder part, an oval fossa for the submandibular gland.

Borders
The superior or alveolar border, wider behind than in front, is hollowed into cavities, for the reception of the teeth; these cavities are sixteen in number and vary in depth and size according to the teeth which they contain. To the outer lip of the superior border, on either side, the buccinator is attached as far forward as the first molar tooth. 
The inferior border is rounded, longer than the superior, and thicker in front than behind; at the point where it joins the lower border of the ramus a shallow groove; for the facial artery, may be present.

Ramus 

The ramus of the human mandible has four sides, two surfaces, four borders, and two processes.

On the outside, the ramus is flat and marked by oblique ridges at its lower part. It gives attachment throughout nearly the whole of its extent to the masseter muscle.

On the inside at the center there is an oblique mandibular foramen, for the entrance of the inferior alveolar vessels and nerve. The margin of this opening is irregular; it presents in front a prominent ridge, surmounted by a sharp spine, the lingula of the mandible, which gives attachment to the sphenomandibular ligament; at its lower and back part is a notch from which the mylohyoid groove runs obliquely downward and forward, and lodges the mylohyoid vessels and nerve. Behind this groove is a rough surface, for the insertion of the medial pterygoid muscle. The mandibular canal runs obliquely downward and forward in the ramus, and then horizontally forward in the body, where it is placed under the alveoli and communicates with them by small openings.  On arriving at the incisor teeth, it turns back to communicate with the mental foramen, giving off two small canals which run to the cavities containing the incisor teeth. In the posterior two-thirds of the bone the canal is situated nearer the internal surface of the mandible; and in the anterior third, nearer its external surface. It contains the inferior alveolar vessels and nerve, from which branches are distributed to the teeth.

Borders
The lower border of the ramus is thick, straight, and continuous with the inferior border of the body of the bone. At its junction with the posterior border is the angle of the mandible, which may be either inverted or everted and is marked by rough, oblique ridges on each side, for the attachment of the masseter laterally, and the medial pterygoid muscle medially; the stylomandibular ligament is attached to the angle between these muscles. The anterior border is thin above, thicker below, and continuous with the oblique line. 
The region where the lower border meets the posterior border is the angle of the mandible, often called the gonial angle.
The posterior border is thick, smooth, rounded, and covered by the parotid gland. The upper border is thin, and is surmounted by two processes, the coronoid in front and the condyloid behind, separated by a deep concavity, the mandibular notch.

Processes
The coronoid process is a thin, triangular eminence, which is flattened from side to side and varies in shape and size. 
The condyloid process is thicker than the coronoid, and consists of two portions: the mandibular condyle, and the constricted portion which supports it, the neck. The condyle is the most superior part of the mandible and is part of the temporomandibular joint.
The mandibular notch, separating the two processes, is a deep semilunar depression and is crossed by the masseteric vessels and nerve.

Foramina 
The mandible has two main holes (foramina), found on both its right and left sides:
The mandibular foramen, is above the mandibular angle in the middle of each ramus.
The mental foramen sits on either side of the mental protuberance (chin) on the body of mandible, usually inferior to the apices of the mandibular first and second premolars. As mandibular growth proceeds in young children, the mental foramen alters in direction of its opening from anterior to posterosuperior. The mental foramen allows the entrance of the mental nerve and blood vessels into the mandibular canal.

Nerves

The inferior alveolar nerve, a branch of the mandibular nerve, (a major division of the trigeminal nerve), enters the mandibular foramen and runs forward in the mandibular canal, supplying sensation to the teeth. At the mental foramen, the nerve divides into two terminal branches: incisive and mental nerves. The incisive nerve runs forward in the mandible and supplies the anterior teeth. The mental nerve exits the mental foramen and supplies sensation to the lower lip.

Variation
Males generally have squarer, stronger, and larger mandibles than females. The mental protuberance is more pronounced in males but can be visualized and palpated in females.

Rarely, a bifid inferior alveolar nerve may be present, in which case a second mandibular foramen, more inferiorly placed, exists and can be detected by noting a doubled mandibular canal on a radiograph.

Development
The mandible forms as a bone (ossifies) over time from a left and right piece of cartilage, called Meckel's cartilage.

These cartilages form the cartilaginous bar of the mandibular arch. Near the head, they are connected with the ear capsules, and they meet at the lower end at the mandibular symphysis, a fusion point between the two bones, by mesodermal tissue. They run forward immediately below the condyles and then, bending downward, lie in a groove near the lower border of the bone; in front of the canine tooth they incline upward to the symphysis. From the proximal end of each cartilage the malleus and incus, two of the bones of the middle ear, are developed; the next succeeding portion, as far as the lingula, is replaced by fibrous tissue, which persists to form the sphenomandibular ligament.

Between the lingula and the canine tooth the cartilage disappears, while the portion of it below and behind the incisor teeth becomes ossified and incorporated with this part of the mandible.

About the sixth week of fetal life, intramembranous ossification takes place in the membrane covering the outer surface of the ventral end of Meckel's cartilage, and each half of the bone is formed from a single center which appears, near the mental foramen.

By the tenth week, the portion of Meckel's cartilage which lies below and behind the incisor teeth is surrounded and invaded by the dermal bone (also known as the membrane bone). Somewhat later, accessory nuclei of cartilage make their appearance:
a wedge-shaped nucleus in the condyloid process and extending downward through the ramus;
a small strip along the anterior border of the coronoid process;
smaller nuclei in the front part of both alveolar walls and along the front of the lower border of the bone.

These accessory nuclei possess no separate ossific centers but are invaded by the surrounding dermal bone and undergo absorption.  The inner alveolar border, usually described as arising from a separate ossific center (splenial center), is formed in the human mandible by an ingrowth from the main mass of the bone.

At birth the bone consists of two parts, united by a fibrous symphysis, in which ossification takes place during the first year.

Aging
At birth, the body of the bone is a mere shell, containing the sockets of the two incisor, the canine, and the two deciduous molar teeth, imperfectly partitioned off from one another. The mandibular canal is of large size and runs near the lower border of the bone; the mental foramen opens beneath the socket of the first deciduous molar tooth. The angle is obtuse (175°), and the condyloid portion is nearly in line with the body. The coronoid process is of comparatively large size, and projects above the level of the condyle.

After birth, the two segments of the bone become joined at the symphysis, from below upward, in the first year; but a trace of separation may be visible in the beginning of the second year, near the alveolar margin. The body becomes elongated in its whole length, but more especially behind the mental foramen, to provide space for the three additional teeth developed in this part. The depth of the body increases owing to increased growth of the alveolar part, to afford room for the roots of the teeth, and by thickening of the subdental portion which enables the jaw to withstand the powerful action of the masticatory muscles; but, the alveolar portion is the deeper of the two, and, consequently, the chief part of the body lies above the oblique line. The mandibular canal, after the second dentition, is situated just above the level of the mylohyoid line; and the mental foramen occupies the position usual to it in the adult. The angle becomes less obtuse, owing to the separation of the jaws by the teeth; about the fourth year it is 140°.

In the adult, the alveolar and subdental portions of the body are usually of equal depth. The mental foramen opens midway between the upper and lower borders of the bone, and the mandibular canal runs nearly parallel with the mylohyoid line. The ramus is almost vertical in direction, the angle measuring from 110° to 120°, also the adult condyle is higher than the coronoid process and the sigmoid notch becomes deeper.

In old age, the bone can become greatly reduced in volume where there is a loss of teeth, and consequent resorption of the alveolar process and interalveolar septa. Consequently, the chief part of the bone is below the oblique line. The mandibular canal, with the mental foramen opening from it, is closer to the alveolar border. The ramus is oblique in direction, the angle measures about 140°, and the neck of the condyle is more or less bent backward.

Function 

The mandible forms the lower jaw and holds the lower teeth in place. It articulates with the left and right temporal bones at the temporomandibular joints.
Condyloid process, superior (upper) and posterior projection from the ramus, which makes the temporomandibular joint with the temporal bone
Coronoid process, superior and anterior projection from the ramus. This provides attachment to the temporal muscle.

Teeth sit in the upper part of the body of the mandible.
The frontmost part of teeth is more narrow and holds front teeth. 
The back part holds wider and flatter teeth primarily for chewing food. These teeth also often have wide and sometimes deep grooves on the surfaces.

Clinical significance

Fracture 

One fifth of facial injuries involve a mandibular fracture. Mandibular fractures are often accompanied by a 'twin fracture' on the opposite side. There is no universally accepted treatment protocol, as there is no consensus on the choice of techniques in a particular anatomical shape of mandibular fracture clinic.  A common treatment involves attachment of metal plates to the fracture to assist in healing.

The mandible may be dislocated anteriorly (to the front) and inferiorly (downwards) but very rarely posteriorly (backwards). The articular disk of the temporomandibular joint prevents the mandible from moving posteriorly, making the condylar neck particularly vulnerable to fractures.

The mandibular alveolar process can become resorbed when completely edentulous in the mandibular arch (occasionally noted also in partially edentulous cases). This resorption can occur to such an extent that the mental foramen is virtually on the superior border of the mandible, instead of opening on the anterior surface, changing its relative position. However, the more inferior body of the mandible is not affected and remains thick and rounded. With age and tooth loss, the alveolar process is absorbed so that the mandibular canal becomes nearer the superior border. Sometimes with excessive alveolar process absorption, the mandibular canal disappears entirely and leaves the inferior alveolar nerve without its bony protection, although it is still covered by soft tissue.

Forensic medicine 
When remains of humans are found, the mandible is one of the common findings, sometimes the only bone found. Skilled experts can estimate the age of the human upon death because the mandible changes over a person's life.

Other vertebrates

In lobe-finned fishes and the early fossil tetrapods, the bone homologous to the mandible of mammals is merely the largest of several bones in the lower jaw. In such animals, it is referred to as the dentary bone or os dentale, and forms the body of the outer surface of the jaw. It is bordered below by a number of splenial bones, while the angle of the jaw is formed by a lower angular bone and a suprangular bone just above it. The inner surface of the jaw is lined by a prearticular bone, while the articular bone forms the articulation with the skull proper. Finally a set of three narrow coronoid bones lie above the prearticular bone. As the name implies, the majority of the teeth are attached to the dentary, but there are commonly also teeth on the coronoid bones, and sometimes on the prearticular as well.

This complex primitive pattern has, however, been simplified to various degrees in the great majority of vertebrates, as bones have either fused or vanished entirely. In teleosts, only the dentary, articular, and angular bones remain, while in living amphibians, the dentary is accompanied only by the prearticular, and, in salamanders, one of the coronoids. The lower jaw of reptiles has only a single coronoid and splenial, but retains all the other primitive bones except the prearticular and the periosteum.

While, in birds, these various bones have fused into a single structure, in mammals most of them have disappeared, leaving an enlarged dentary as the only remaining bone in the lower jaw – the mandible. As a result of this, the primitive jaw articulation, between the articular and quadrate bones, has been lost, and replaced with an entirely new articulation between the mandible and the temporal bone. An intermediate stage can be seen in some therapsids, in which both points of articulation are present. Aside from the dentary, only few other bones of the primitive lower jaw remain in mammals; the former articular and quadrate bones survive as the malleus and the incus of the middle ear.

Finally, the cartilaginous fish, such as sharks, do not have any of the bones found in the lower jaw of other vertebrates. Instead, their lower jaw is composed of a cartilagenous structure homologous with the Meckel's cartilage of other groups. This also remains a significant element of the jaw in some primitive bony fish, such as sturgeons.

Society and culture
 In the Book of Judges, Samson used a donkey's jawbone to kill a thousand Philistines.
Dental remains of Adolf Hitler including part of a mandible with teeth were the solitary physical evidence used to confirm his death in 1945. The Soviet account published in 1968 describes and photographically depicts the jawbone as being broken off at the alveolar process.

Additional images

See also 

 Bone terminology
 Oral and maxillofacial surgery
 Simian shelf
 Terms for anatomical location

References

External links

Vertebrate anatomy
Parts of a bird beak
Facial bones